Hypolycaena phemis is a butterfly in the family Lycaenidae. It was described by Hamilton Herbert Druce in 1895. It is found on Borneo.

References

Butterflies described in 1895
Hypolycaenini
Butterflies of Borneo